The 2008 season was the 5th season of competitive football by Universidad San Martín de Porres.

Statistics

Appearances and goals
Last updated on January, 2008.

Competition Overload

Copa Libertadores 2008

Group stage

Primera División Peruana 2008

Apertura 2008

Clausura 2008

Pre-season friendlies

Transfers

In

Out

References

External links 
 Everything about Deportivo Universidad San Martín
 Deportivo Universidad San Martín de Porres - season 2008
 Deportivo Universidad San Martín de Porres - Copa Libertadores 2008

2008
2008 in Peruvian football